In enzymology, a hydroxyphenylpyruvate reductase is an enzyme that catalyzes the chemical reaction

3-(4-hydroxyphenyl)lactate + NAD+  3-(4-hydroxyphenyl)pyruvate + NADH + H+

Thus, the two substrates of this enzyme are 3-(4-hydroxyphenyl)lactate and NAD+, whereas its 3 products are 3-(4-hydroxyphenyl)pyruvate, NADH, and H+.

This enzyme belongs to the family of oxidoreductases, specifically those acting on the CH-OH group of donor with NAD+ or NADP+ as acceptor. The systematic name of this enzyme class is 4-hydroxyphenyllactate:NAD+ oxidoreductase. This enzyme is also called HPRP. This enzyme participates in tyrosine metabolism and phenylalanine metabolism.

References 

 

EC 1.1.1
NADH-dependent enzymes
Enzymes of unknown structure
Hydroxycinnamic acids metabolism